The Cancionero general or Cancionero general de Hernando del Castillo is a lyric poetry anthology of the late Middle Ages or the early Renaissance. It is mostly devoted to the production in the kingdoms of Castile and León under Enrique IV and the Catholic Monarchs, Isabel de Castilla and Fernando de Aragon. Hernando del Castillo is responsible for the compilation which began around 1490 and was first printed in 1511 under the name of Cancionero general de muchos y diversos autores.

Structure
The work is divided into nine parts according to their themes:

 Devoción y moralidad
 Obras de poetas diversos
 Canciones
 Invenciones y letras de justadores
 Motes y sus glosas
 Villancicos
 Preguntas y respuestas
 Obras menudas
 Obras de burlas

Editions 
The first edition of the Cancionero General  was printed by Cristóbal Koffman in Valencia in 1511, and was frequently reprinted:

 Valencia, 1511, Cristóbal Koffman.
 Valencia, 1514,  Jorge Costilla.
 Toledo, 1517, 1520 y 1527, Juan de Villaquirán.
 Sevilla, 1535 y 1540, Juan Cromberger.
 Amberes, 1557 y 1573, Martín Nucio.

Some of its editions were censored, particularly the section on "burlas."

Poetry collections